Karambola may refer to: 

 Carambola, a fruit
 Filipino variant of carrom, a tabletop game
 Colloquial Filipino term for multiple-vehicle collision
 Karambola (radio program), a political talk program